"Beggin' on Your Knees" is a song performed by the Victorious cast featuring American singer Victoria Justice. It was produced by Kristian Lundin and Shellback, who also co-wrote the song with Savan Kotecha, for Victorious: Music from the Hit TV Show (2011), the soundtrack to the Nickelodeon television series, Victorious. It was released as the album's second single on April 1, 2011 through Columbia Records in association with Nickelodeon. Musically, the song runs through a synthpop oriented beat with teen pop lyrics, and the lyrics speak of vengeance against a cheating boyfriend.

The song was met with generally positive reviews from critics, with the majority of them praising its message. "Beggin' on Your Knees" has currently charted on the Billboard Hot 100 at number fifty-eight, remaining as the second highest peaking song from the soundtrack. The accompanying music video portrays Justice following her unfaithful boyfriend while in the carnival having fun with the Victorious cast. The music video premiered on March 12, 2011 on Nickelodeon, during the TV movie Best Player.

Background 
"Beggin' on Your Knees" is the second single released from the soundtrack Victorious: Music from the Hit TV Show (2011), for the television series of the same name on Nickelodeon. It was first heard on the series' second season debut episode, "Beggin' on Your Knees", which premiered on April 2, 2011 in North America, a day after the single's release. The song was performed by Justice with backup dancers in the episode. After learning of her new partner's agenda, Tori Vega (Justice) enlists the help of Andre Harris (Leon Thomas III) to write and produce the song. The scene where the song was performed features Justice with her partner Ryder Daniels (Ryan Rottman) on stage. As Ryder is about to start singing, he recognizes that his microphone is not functioning. Tori continues singing, making gestures at him with the spotlight flashing on him the entire time, indicating who the song is written about. Tori and Andre wrote the song after learning that Ryder was using her and other girls to pass his school grades, and the song was made to make him fail the singing exam and expose him as a heartbreaking liar.

The song was written by Savan Kotecha and Shellback. Shellback also produced the track along with providing all the instruments and programming for it. He also provided the recording for the song, which took place at Maratome Studios in Stockholm, Sweden.  Kristian Lundin also recorded the song at CMK Island Studios and Westlake Studios, both in Los Angeles, California. The mixing for the song was provided by Serban Ghenea took place at MixStar Studios in Virginia Beach, Virginia with the engineering provided by John Hanes and assistance provided by Tim Roberts.

Composition 
"Beggin' on Your Knees" is an electronic rock song that contains influences of Hi-NRG, teen pop and dance-pop. The song runs through a dance-oriented beat and features a lighter sound than the preceding single, "Freak the Freak Out". The theme of this song is center around vengeance and coming of age. The lyrics are about a seeking vengeance on her boyfriend after learning of his relationship with another girl. Victoria Justice's vocal range spans almost two octaves from the low note of A3 to the high belted note of F5.

Critical reception
Jessica Dawson of Common Sense Media, the website that rates music for parents approval for children's listening, rated the song three out of five stars, praising its playful and child-friendly nature, while warning parents of the main message, commenting that "The lyrics are playful but could be construed as menacing: "You messed with me, and messed with her, so I'll make sure you get what you
deserve" and "Watch your back, you don't know when or where I could get
you.""  Joe DeAndrea of AbsolutePunk praised the song, along with "Freak the Freak Out", for its catchy nature, further commenting that "They will get stuck in your head and you'll probably feel a little ashamed, but no worries: it's the good type of ashamed! Like eating chocolate cake in a bathtub alone on a Friday night. But really, it's easier to accept it when you realize that the songs aren't all that worse than what is currently on the radio." Bob Hoose and Steven Isaac of Plugged In Online, a site that rates music for children's listening, condemned the song for its objectionable content, mainly noting "the singer has payback schemes on her mind: "You mess with me/and messed with her/ … So watch your back/'Cause you don't know when or where I could get you/ … I'll have you crawlin' like a centipede.""

Chart performance
"Beggin' on Your Knees" debuted at number 83 on the US Billboard Hot 100 on the April 16, 2011 chart and peaked at number 58 in the next week.

Music video
The video was directed by Marcus Wagner. The video was shot at the pier, in the city of Santa Monica. In the video, Justice is a girl having fun with her friends at a carnival when she finds out that her boyfriend has cheated on her with another girl (Halston Sage). So, she watches her boyfriend, remembering the good times they had, looking for the right moment to confront him about his other girlfriend. In the end Justice decides to whisper in the other girl's ear, to tell her that the boyfriend is cheating and so both girls dump the boyfriend. Justice moves on and decides to forget the boyfriend and have fun.

Performances
On April 2, 2011, the day after the song was officially released as a single, Justice performed a short version of the song in the "Countdown to Kids' Choice", shown one hour before the 2011 Kids' Choice Awards.

The song was also performed on the season two premiere of Victorious, which also starred Halston Sage who appeared as Sadie.

Credits and personnel
Victoria Justice – vocals, songwriting
Shellback – songwriting, production, recording, programming, instrumentation
Savan Kotecha – songwriting
Kristian Lundin – production, recording
Serban Ghenea – mixing
John Hanes – engineering
Tim Roberts – assistant engineering

Credits are taken from Victorious liner notes.

Charts

Weekly charts

Year-end charts

References

2011 singles
2011 songs
Victoria Justice songs
Victorious
Songs written by Savan Kotecha
Songs written by Shellback (record producer)
Song recordings produced by Shellback (record producer)
Columbia Records singles
Songs about infidelity
Songs from television series